Payyappilly Varghese Kathanar was a Syro-Malabar priest from the Indian state of Kerala and the founder of the congregation of Sisters of the Destitute. He was declared Venerable by Pope Francis on 14 April 2018.

Family
Kathanar was born as Kunjuvaru on 8 August 1876 to Payyappilly Lonan and Kunjumariam in the Palakkappilly branch of Payyappilly Nasrani family at Perumanoor, Thevara. Payyappilly is an ancient Saint Thomas Christian family in India, baptized by Thomas the Apostle in the first century. The word Payyappilly, translated as "beautiful building" or "beautiful house", is derived from the Syriac ܦܐܝܐ Payya "beautiful, radiant" and the Malayalam word പിള്ളി Pilly, a variant of പള്ളി Pally, "church, building". Mary Celine Payyappilly is another Servant of God from the Payyappilly family.

Life
Varghese Kathanar was educated in the parish school at Perumanoor and at St. Albert's School, Ernakulam. He received his religious training from the Mangalapuzha Seminary at Puthenpally and the Papal Seminary at Kandy, Sri Lanka. He was ordained a priest on 21 December 1907 and was known as Payyappilly Palakkappilly Varghese Kathanar. He learned the Syriac language under the guidance of Aloysius Pazheparambil.

Varghese Kathanar served as parish priest in Kadamakkudy (1909–11), Alangad (1911–13) and Arakuzha (1920–22). During his tenure in Marth Mariam Syro-Malabar Catholic Forane Church, Arakuzha he began the St. Mary's Higher Secondary School there. His efforts transformed the parish and helped to solve many long-lasting family problems. He made some land purchases for the church, thus making it self-sufficient. He also purchased  of land in M. C. Road for constructing St. Joseph's Syro-Malabar Catholic Church, Meenkunnam.

He was manager of St. Mary's High School, Aluva, Travancore, between 1913–1920 and 1922–1929. According to Joseph Parecattil, who was a pupil at the time, the school was a seedbed of priestly vocations during Varghese Kathanar's tenure.

Varghese Kathanar served as a member of the Diocesan Council, as Director of Apostolic Union as well as Priests' Provident Fund. He was a good mediator and people approached him seeking solutions to their problems. He was held in great honour by the church authorities and equally by the officials in the education department and government officers. His concern and care for the poor and the suffering were noted particularly in the way he helped the victims of a flood in 1924. He transformed his parish into a center for the homeless and turned St. Mary's High School into a shelter for the suffering people and brought food for them in a hired boat.

Sisters of the Destitute
On 19 March 1927, Varghese Kathanar founded the Sisters of the Destitute in Chunangamvely. This organisation was intended to continue what he saw as Christ's redemptive mission among the poor. He found abandoned people, brought them to the shelter of the Home for the Aged and nursed them. The S.D. was originally named Little Sisters of the Poor but in 1933 the name was changed to Sisters of the Destitute in order not to be confused with another congregation having the same title.

Death
Varghese Kathanar fell ill in September 1929 and eventually was hospitalised. He died of typhoid on 5 October 1929 and was buried in St. John Nepumsian Syrian Catholic Church, Konthuruthy.

Stages of canonization

Servant of God
The Cause of the Beatification of Varghese Kathanar was initiated on 25 August 2009. He was declared as Servant of God by Varkey Vithayathil, Major Archbishop of the Syro-Malabar Catholic Church on 6 September 2009.

Venerable
In February 2011, his remains were exhumed, identified and transferred to a new tomb. The Miracle Tribunal that had been established to study the miraculous healing of Sr. Mercina through Varghese Kathanar's intercession was closed in May 2012 and the Archdiocesan Tribunal was closed in November 2012. His case was submitted to the Congregation for the Causes of Saints, Rome, and on 14 April 2018 Pope Francis declared him "Venerable".

Gallery

References

1876 births
1929 deaths
Syro-Malabar priests
Archdiocese of Ernakulam-Angamaly
Founders of Catholic religious communities
Christian clergy from Kochi
People from Ernakulam district
Indian Eastern Catholics
Malayali people
Eastern Catholic Servants of God
20th-century venerated Christians
Venerated Catholics by Pope Francis